Shiwe Octovia Nogwanya (also Nongwanya; born 7 March 1994) is a South African football striker. She plays for Bloemfontein Celtic and the South Africa women's national football team.

Playing career
Nongwanya was called up to the senior national team in February 2013 in preparation for the 2013 Cyprus Cup. She made her first appearance for the team during the tournament. In September 2014, Nongwanya was named to the roster for the 2014 African Women's Championship in Namibia.

References

Living people
1994 births
People from Kroonstad
Women's association football forwards
South African women's soccer players
Footballers at the 2016 Summer Olympics
South Africa women's international soccer players
Olympic soccer players of South Africa
Soccer players from the Free State (province)